William Horace Bolden (May 9, 1893 – December 8, 1966), nicknamed "Big Bill", was a pitcher in Major League Baseball. He played for the St. Louis Cardinals in 1919.

References

External links

1893 births
1966 deaths
Major League Baseball pitchers
St. Louis Cardinals players
Baseball players from Tennessee
People from Dandridge, Tennessee